Otto Rohwedder (3 December 1909 – 15 June 1969) was a German footballer and manager who played as a forward and made five appearances for the Germany national team.

Career
Rohwedder made his international debut for Germany on 7 October 1934 in a friendly against Denmark. He scored Germany's third goal in the away match, which took place in Copenhagen and finished as a 5–2 win. He went on to earn five caps and score two goals for Germany, making his final appearance on 25 April 1937 in a friendly against Belgium, which finished as a 1–0 win in Hanover.

Personal life
Rohwedder died on 15 June 1969 at the age of 59.

Career statistics

International

International goals

References

External links
 
 
 
 
 
 

1909 births
1969 deaths
Footballers from Hamburg
German footballers
Germany international footballers
Association football forwards
Eimsbütteler TV players
SV Arminia Hannover players
Hamburger SV players
German football managers
Association football player-managers
Hamburger SV managers